The 2019–20 NWHL season was the fifth season of the National Women's Hockey League. All five teams from the previous season returned: the Boston Pride, Buffalo Beauts, Connecticut Whale, Metropolitan Riveters, and the Minnesota Whitecaps.

The NWHL completed the semifinal round of the 2020 Isobel Cup playoffs, but had to postpone the championship game between Boston and Minnesota originally scheduled for March 13, 2020, due to the ongoing COVID-19 pandemic. On May 15, the final was cancelled and the Isobel Cup was not awarded.

League changes

2019 offseason events
Following the 2018–19 season, the Canadian Women's Hockey League (CWHL) ceased operations citing the fragmentation of corporate sponsors between the CWHL and NWHL caused their league to be financially infeasible. The NWHL then announced it was pursuing adding two CWHL markets to the league, Montreal and Toronto, if the NWHL found financial backers for the teams.

On May 2, 2019, over 200 players from both the CWHL and NWHL released a joint statement announcing their intent to not participate in any North American professional league for the 2019–20 season citing their dissatisfaction in the operations of both leagues in that neither provided health insurance or a livable salary. The NWHL responded with that they were pursuing many more sponsors than in previous years and hoped to increase player salaries. and agreed to give players a 50 percent split of revenue on league sponsorship and media deals. On May 20, 2019, the players formed a worker's union called the Professional Women's Hockey Player Association (PWHPA) to further push for their stated goals of a league that provides financial and infrastructure resources to players, health insurance, and support to training programs for young female players. With a large number of North American players boycotting the league, more than half of the signed players on opening rosters were new to the league.

On May 8, 2019, Pegula Sports and Entertainment (PSE), the owners of the Buffalo Beauts, relinquished ownership and operations of the team back to the NWHL, but continued to claim rights to the Beauts name as part of the turnover. The Beauts then changed their home venue from the PSE-owned Harborcenter to the Northtown Center in the Buffalo suburb of Amherst.

On May 17, 2019, the New Jersey Devils ended their partnership with the Metropolitan Riveters. The Riveters then changed their home venue from the Devils' practice rink to ProSkate Ice Arena in Monmouth Junction, New Jersey, and returned to their original jersey colors.

With the player strike, loss of support from the NHL teams, and lack of additional investors, the NWHL announced they would not be able to increase to full-time salaries or provide players with health insurance outside of the typical worker's compensation for injuries, but had come to an agreement to a 50 percent revenue split on all league-wide sponsorship and media deals. In addition, the league also stated they would not add Montreal and Toronto for the 2019–20 season. The league announced a longer 2019–20 season for the teams, going from 16 to 24 games.

Also during the offseason, the Connecticut Whale relocated to Danbury, Connecticut, and the Boston Pride were purchased by a group of investors led by Miles Arnone.

Head coach changes

Regular season

Standings
Final standings.

Schedule

Playoffs

All-Star Game
The 2020 NWHL All-Star Game and its weekend festivities took place on February 8–9, 2020, at Warrior Ice Arena, the Boston Pride's home arena. The teams were captained by Jillian Dempsey of the Boston Pride and Madison Packer of the Metropolitan Riveters, who drafted their rosters from the selected all-star players in a draft.

The skills challenge took place on February 8. Team Packer won the fastest skater (Grace Kleinbach of Connecticut) and hardest shot (Kaleigh Fratkin of Boston), while Team Dempsey won fastest goalie (Mariah Fujimagari of Buffalo), shooting accuracy (Jillian Dempsey), and the team relay. Team Packer ultimately won the skills competition via the team shootout competition. On February 11, the league awarded fastest skater to Team Dempsey's Allie Thunstrom of the Minnesota Whitecaps following a review and a timing error.

The All-Star Game took place the following day on February 9. The game was a four-on-four format with Team Dempsey winning 5–2. The game was sold out in the 800-seat arena and had about 10,000 viewers watching the game live on Twitch.

Awards and honors
 Jillian Dempsey (Boston Pride) and Allie Thunstrom (Minnesota Whitecaps), 2020 Most Valuable Players
* Lovisa Selander, Boston Pride, 2020 Goaltender of the Year
 Kaleigh Fratkin, Boston Pride, 2020 Defender of the Year
 Jillian Dempsey, Boston Pride, 2020 Scoring Champion
* Kate Leary, Metropolitan Riveters, 2020 Newcomer of the Year

References

External links
 

 
NWHL
NWHL season
2019–20 in women's ice hockey leagues